Yesenia Miranda (born March 26, 1994) is a Salvadoran racewalker. She competed at the 2016 Summer Olympics in the women's 20 kilometres walk but did not finish the race.

References

1994 births
Living people
Salvadoran female racewalkers
Olympic athletes of El Salvador
Athletes (track and field) at the 2016 Summer Olympics